Sveta Grigorjeva (or Svetlana Grigorjeva; born on 16 January 1988 in Tallinn) is an Estonian choreographer, dancer and poet.

Works
 2013: poetry collection "Kes kardab sveta grigorjevat?"

References

Living people
1988 births
Estonian women poets
Estonian choreographers
Estonian female dancers
21st-century Estonian poets
Tallinn University alumni
Estonian people of Russian descent
People from Tallinn
Writers from Tallinn